Kintpuash, also known as Kientpaush, Kientpoos, and Captain Jack (c. 1837 – October 3, 1873), was a chief of the Modoc tribe of California and Oregon. Kintpuash's name in the Modoc language meant 'Strikes the water brashly.'

He led a band from the Klamath Reservation to return to their lands in California, where they resisted return. From 1872 to 1873, their small force made use of the lava beds, holding off more numerous United States Army forces for months in the Modoc War.

Kintpuash was the only Native American leader ever to be charged with war crimes, and he was executed by the Army, along with several followers, for their ambush killings of General Edward Canby and Reverend Eleazar Thomas at a peace commission meeting. The Modoc leaders were hanged for war crimes by the Army.

Life
Kintpuash was born about 1837 into a Modoc family in their ancestral territory near Tule Lake. The Modoc occupied about 5,000 acres here, along what became the California-Oregon border after European colonization.

In 1864, the Modoc still lived in their ancestral home near Tule Lake. Due to the pressure of white colonizers who wanted to steal and farm the fertile land in this territory, Kintpuash and his family were among the Modoc forcefully removed by the United States to the Klamath Reservation in southwestern Oregon. This was primarily occupied by their traditional rivals, the much larger Klamath tribe. The Klamath outnumbered the newcomers, and the reservation was on traditional Klamath land; the Modoc complained of poor treatment and conflict with the Klamath.

In 1865, Kintpuash, by then informally called Captain Jack by American colonizers, led a band of Modoc from the reservation back to their home in California. In 1869, the band were rounded up by the United States Army and returned to the Klamath Reservation. Finding conditions had not improved, in April 1870, Captain Jack led a band of about 180 Modoc back to the Tule Lake area.

Modoc War, 1872–73
In 1872, US Army forces were sent to capture Kintpuash's band and force them back to the reservation. On November 29, while their surrender was being negotiated at the Lost River in Oregon, fighting broke out between a soldier and one of the Modoc warriors. The brief Battle of Lost River ensued.

Kintpuash fled with his band into the area now protected as the Lava Beds National Monument. The band settled into this natural fortress. His warriors made use of its many caves and trenches in the lava beds for defensive fighting, and women and children could be sheltered. When the Modoc were finally located, the Army launched an attack on January 17, 1873; the Army was left with 35 dead and many wounded, while the Modoc suffered no casualties.

Kintpuash's advisers, not understanding differences between Modoc and Euro-American culture, suggested that the Army would leave if their warriors killed its leader General Edward Canby. Kintpuash hoped for a peaceful solution that would allow his people to stay in their territory.

He entered into negotiations with a federal peace commission. During the months-long negotiations, the Modoc hawks gained in influence. Kintpuash was shamed, his opponents throwing the hat of a Modoc woman at him to symbolically strip him of his manhood. To bolster his influence, Kintpuash agreed to their plan: he called for a meeting with the commission (of which Canby was then the chairman) with the intention of killing them all. During the next meeting of the peace commission on April 11, Kintpuash and several other Modoc drew pistols at a prearranged signal; he shot General Canby twice in the head and cut his throat, and Boston Charley killed Reverend Eleazar Thomas, a California minister; two other commissioners were wounded. The Modoc fled to the lava beds.

Canby was the only general killed during the Indian Wars. (Custer's permanent rank was lieutenant colonel). In reaction, Canby's successor, General Jefferson C. Davis, brought in more than 1000 soldiers as reinforcements, determined to crush the Modoc resistance. On April 14, the Army attacked the lava stronghold, and many of the Modoc scattered to escape capture.

Surrender and execution

Over the next several months, various groups of Modoc continued to fight the army, while some began to surrender. Kintpuash successfully evaded the Army until some Modoc agreed to capture him and turn him in; these men included Hooker Jim, Bogus Charley, Shacknasty Jim, and Steamboat Frank. On June 1, Kintpuash surrendered, ceremonially laying down his rifle. He was taken to Fort Klamath. After being tried by a military court and found guilty, Kintpuash was hanged on October 3, 1873, for the murders of General Canby and Reverend Thomas. Black Jim, John Schonchin, and Boston Charley had also been convicted and were hanged with him. Some other warriors were sent to prison.

Fate of remains
After the execution, Kintpuash's body was transported by freight train to Yreka. There were rumors that his body was embalmed to be used as a carnival attraction in the Eastern states. This was never documented. The Army had tried to keep the fate of the Modoc remains a secret. They severed the Modocs' heads after the executions at Fort Klamath, sending them on October 25 by train to Washington, DC, to the Army Medical Museum for study.

In 1898, the Army transferred the skulls to the Smithsonian Institution. In the 1970s, descendants of Kintpuash learned that his skull was at the Smithsonian and appealed for its return. In 1984 the Smithsonian returned Kintpuash's skull to his relatives, who acted as tribal representatives to receive also the skulls of Boston Charley, Black Jim, and John Schonchin, and of an unknown Modoc woman whose remains had been recovered from the Lava Beds.

Legacy
The area where the Modoc established their defense is now known as Captain Jack's Stronghold. It is part of the protected area of the Lava Beds National Monument.
Captain Jack Substation, a Bonneville Power Administration electrical substation, was named in honor of Kintpuash. It is located near what is now called Captain Jack's Stronghold. It forms the northern end of Path 66, a high-power electric transmission line.

See also
 Oliver Cromwell Applegate

References

Further reading
Arthur Quinn, Hell with the Fire Out: A History of the Modoc War (1997), includes coverage of Kintpuash.

External links

 "Oregon Experience: The Modoc War", Oregon Public Broadcasting, July 2012.  – Video (57:14)
 Indian Country Today June 15, 2016

Modoc people
Native American leaders
Native American people of the Indian Wars
People of the Modoc War
Executed people from California
Executed Native American people
19th-century executions by the United States
19th-century executions of American people
People executed for murder
People executed by Oregon by hanging
People executed by the United States military by hanging
1830s births
1873 deaths
Year of birth uncertain
1873 murders in the United States
19th-century Native Americans